The men's 25 metre rapid fire pistol event at the 2019 European Games in Minsk, Belarus took place on 25 and 26 June at the Shooting Centre.

Schedule
All times are  local (UTC+3).

Records

Results

Qualification

Final

References

Men's 25 metre rapid fire pistol